Deryn Rees-Jones is an Anglo-Welsh poet, who lives and works in Liverpool. Although, Rees-Jones has spent much of her life in Liverpool, she spent much of her childhood in the family home of Eglwys-bach in North Wales. She considers herself a Welsh writer.

Rees-Jones did doctoral research on women poets at Birkbeck College, and is now a Professor of Poetry at Liverpool University. She won an Eric Gregory Award in 1993, and an Arts Council of England Writer's Award in 1996.

Works

She has published three poetry books with Seren, The Memory Tray (1994), which was shortlisted for the Forward Prize for Best First Collection; Signs Round a Dead Body (1998), a Poetry Book Society Special Commendation; and Quiver: A Murder Mystery (2004). A pamphlet, Falls and Finds, appeared from Shoestring in 2008. She has also co-edited a book of essays, Contemporary Women’s Poetry: Reading/Writing/Practice (2001), with Alison Mark, and published a monograph, Carol Ann Duffy (2001) in Northcote House's Writers & Their Work series. Her critical study Consorting with Angels: Essays on Modern Women Poets was published by Bloodaxe in 2005 at the same time as its companion anthology Modern Women Poets. In 2012 and 2019, Rees-Jones was shortlisted for the prestigious T. S. Eliot Prize for her 'Burying the Wren' and 'Erato'.

She is also the editor of Pavilion poetry press.

Awards and honors

1993 Eric Gregory Award
2012 T S Eliot Prize, shortlist, Burying the Wren 
2019  T S Eliot Prize, shortlist, Erato

References

20th-century births
20th-century Welsh poets
21st-century Welsh poets
20th-century Welsh women writers
21st-century Welsh women writers
21st-century Welsh writers
English people of Welsh descent
Anglo-Welsh women poets
Living people
Poets from Liverpool
Alumni of Birkbeck, University of London
Academics of the University of Liverpool
Year of birth missing (living people)
Welsh women academics